Morteza Rahmani (also Romanized as Mortezā Raḩmānī; also known as Kalāteh-ye Raḩmānī, Kalāteh-ye Mortāza, Kalāteh-ye Morteẕā, and Raḩmānī') is a village in Sedeh Rural District, Sedeh District, Qaen County, South Khorasan Province, Iran. At the 2006 census, its population was 119, in 42 families.

References 

Populated places in Qaen County